The Connecticut Huskies women's soccer team is an intercollegiate varsity sports team of the University of Connecticut. The team is a member of the Big East Conference of the National Collegiate Athletic Association (NCAA).  The Huskies have appeared in 27 NCAA Tournaments, second all-time, and seven College Cups, tied for seventh all-time.

Head coaches
The table below shows the Huskies' head coaches and their records through the 2020 season.

Stadium 
UConn plays its home games at Morrone Stadium, a 5,100-capacity soccer-specific stadium in Storrs, Connecticut.

ESPN middle finger incident
After defeating South Florida in penalty kicks to win the 2014 American Athletic conference championship, freshman Noriana Radwan gave the middle finger to an ESPN camera. Despite an apology from Radwan her scholarship was revoked by the school, she then launched a federal lawsuit  argued she was punished more harshly than male athletes who violate school and athletic department rules of conduct in 2016. In June 2020 Judge Victor A. Bolden ruled against her. 

Somers CT

References

External links 
Official website

 
1979 establishments in Connecticut